Symphony No. 22 in C major, K. 162, is a symphony composed by Wolfgang Amadeus Mozart in April 1773. The symphony has the scoring of two oboes, two horns, two trumpets, and strings.

The symphony consists of three movements:

Allegro assai, 
Andantino grazioso, 
Presto assai,

References

External links

22
Compositions in C major
1773 compositions